Hugh Burns is a London-based Scottish guitarist and prolific recording artist. His guitar playing can be heard on many famous recordings, including Gerry Rafferty's "Baker Street" (1978) and "Careless Whisper" (1984) by George Michael/Wham!.

Burns has played on albums by:

 Joan Armatrading
 Jack Bruce
 Mutya Buena
 Tony Coe
 Randy Crawford
 Doris Day
 Anne Dudley
 Albert Hammond
 Roy Harper
 Mick Karn
 Ute Lemper
 Paul McCartney
 Alison Moyet
 Oliver Nelson
 Mike Oldfield
 Elaine Paige
 Pet Shop Boys
 Gerry Rafferty
 Scott Walker
 Stealers Wheel
 Wham!

History
Burns made his recording debut in 1970, playing electric guitar and classical guitar on the Oliver Nelson album Black, Brown and Beautiful. Since his debut, his guitar playing has featured on more than 130 albums.

References

External links 
 Hugh Burns credits at AllMusic
 Hugh Burns album releases & credits at Discogs.com

Living people
Scottish male guitarists
Scottish rock guitarists
Scottish session musicians
Year of birth missing (living people)